Mirams is an English surname.

Notable people with this surname include:
 Gordon Mirams (1909-1966), New Zealand film censor
 James Mirams (1839-1916), Australian politician
 Roger Mirams (1918-2004), New Zealand director
 Samuel Haywood Mirams (1837-1911), New Zealand engineer

English-language surnames